"Anyone Can Do the Heartbreak" is a song written by Amanda McBroom and Tom Snow, and performed by Anne Murray.  The song reached #4 on the Canadian Adult Contemporary chart and #27 on the U.S. Country chart in 1987.  It was released in September 1987 as the second single from her album Harmony. The song was produced by Jack White.

Charts

Cover versions
Barry Manilow released a version of the song on his 1989 self-titled album.

References

1987 singles
1987 songs
Anne Murray songs
Barry Manilow songs
Songs written by Amanda McBroom
Songs written by Tom Snow
Capitol Records singles